Nicola di Pietro (fl. late-14th century) was an Italian painter of the Renaissance period, active mainly in Tuscany.

References

14th-century Italian painters
Italian male painters
Painters from Tuscany
Italian Renaissance painters
Year of death unknown
Year of birth unknown